Carlos Rubén Rivera Ruíz (born February 5, 1983) is a Puerto Rican basketball player for Leones de Ponce and the Puerto Rican national team, where he participated at the 2014 FIBA Basketball World Cup and the 2015 FIBA Americas Championship.

High school
He graduated from Miami Christian School in 2003, where he played alongside José Juan Barea.

College
He graduated from Hofstra University in 2007.

References

External links
 Carlos Rivera at RealGM
 Interview in Spanish about Carlos Rivera
 Carlos Rivera BSN Page

1983 births
Living people
Hofstra Pride men's basketball players
Puerto Rican men's basketball players
Point guards
People from San Germán, Puerto Rico
Leones de Ponce basketball players
Shooting guards
2014 FIBA Basketball World Cup players
Fuerza Regia de Monterrey players
Indios de Mayagüez basketball players
Halcones Rojos Veracruz players
Puerto Rican expatriate baseball people in Mexico